The Winchester LMR is a prototype rifle that was developed for military use but was sidelined in 1964 by the AR-15

References

Assault rifles of the United States
Trial and research firearms of the United States